Richmond, Virginia, held a general election on November 8, 2016. Voters elected the Mayor of Richmond, Virginia, members of the Richmond City Council, as well as several other local officials. In an officially nonpartisan, three-way race, Levar Stoney, the former state Secretary of the Commonwealth defeated Jack Berry, former Hanover County Administrator, and Joe Morrissey, former delegate of the Virginia House of Delegates. Former councilperson, Michelle Mosby, finished in a distant third. On January 1, 2017, Stoney took office as the 80th mayor of Richmond, Virginia.

In the Richmond mayoral election, in addition to winning the popular vote, mayoral candidates must win the popular vote in five of the nine city districts. Stoney was able to achieve a majority of the popular vote, receiving 35,525 votes, in addition to winning five city districts, compared to three won by Berry and one won by Morrissey. The night of November 8, the Morrissey campaign conceded to Berry and Stoney, and Berry's campaign conceded to Stoney the following day, when provisional and absentee ballots still had Stoney in the lead.

At the age of 35, Stoney became the youngest politician to ever be elected as the Mayor of Richmond. On November 12, 2016 the Stoney campaign began the transition team between his administration, and Jones' departing administration.

Background 

Incumbent Democrat Dwight C. Jones was ineligible to seek re-election due to mayoral term limits. The election was the fourth citywide election for mayor through popular vote. The election is nonpartisan meaning no candidate can be affiliated with any party on the ticket.

Candidates

Declared 
 Jon Baliles, 1st District City Councilman and former City Planner for Richmond
 Jack Berry, Venture Richmond director and former Hanover County administrator
 Bobby Junes, retired real estate consultant
 Joe Morrissey, former State Delegate and former Richmond Commonwealth's Attorney
 Michelle Mosby, President of the Richmond City Council
 Levar Stoney, former Secretary of the Commonwealth of Virginia
 Bruce Tyler, former Richmond City Councilman and 2015 Republican State Senate candidate (withdrew September 27, but will remain on the ballot)
 Lawrence E. Williams, architect and candidate for Mayor in 2004 and 2008

Withdrawn 
 Mike Dickinson, strip club owner and perennial candidate
 Lillie Estes, community strategist, former substitute teacher and former member of the Richmond Anti-Poverty Commission
 Brad Froman, businessman and write-in candidate for U.S. Senate in 2014
 L. Shirley Harvey, former Richmond City Councilwoman and perennial candidate
 Chad Ingold, teacher at Richmond City Public Schools
 Nate Peterson, medical administrator
 Amon Rayford
 Chuck Richardson, former Richmond City Councilman
 Alan Schintzius, carpenter and former Occupy Richmond activist
 Rick Tatnall, community activist and candidate in 2012

Declined 
 Jeff Bourne, Chairman of the Richmond School Board (running for re-election)
 Chris Hilbert, 3rd District City Councilman (running for re-election)
 Delores McQuinn, State Delegate and former Richmond City Councilwoman
 Charles Samuels, Richmond City Councilman

Endorsements

Polling 

Early polling has suggested that Joe Morrissey is the front-runner in the mayoral election, followed by Jack Berry.

Results

See also 
 2016 Richmond, Virginia City Council elections
 2016 Virginia elections

References

External links 
Campaign finance reports

Official campaign websites
 Jon Baliles for Mayor
 Jack Berry for Mayor
 Bobby Junes for Mayor
 Joe Morrissey for Mayor
 Michelle Mosby for Mayor
 Levar Stoney for Mayor
 Lawrence Williams for Mayor
 Bruce Tyler for Mayor
 Lillie Estes for Mayor
 Brad Froman for Mayor
 L. Shirley Harvey for Mayor
 Chad Ingold for Mayor
 Nate Peterson for Mayor
 Amon Rayford for Mayor

2016 Virginia elections
2016 United States mayoral elections
November 2016 events in the United States
2016
Mayoral election